2600 series may refer to the following:

 2600 series (Chicago "L"), a train operated in the USA
 JR Shikoku 2600 series, a train operated in Japan
 Keihan 2600 series electric multiple unit
 Odakyu 2600 series electric multiple unit